The CCTV Cup is a Chinese Go competition.

Outline
The CCTV Cup is the longest running fast game tournament in China and the sponsor is the Chinese CCTV station. The winner and the runner-up qualify for the Asian TV Cup, where they compete against the winners and runners-up of the Japanese NHK Cup and the South Korean KBS Cup.

Each player has 1 hour of main time with one 60-second byoyomi period. The time control was changed in 2021 to be much slower than the previous time limit, which was one move every 30 seconds. The winner's prize is 300,000 RMB (as of 2021). The prize money was last increased in 2020, from the previous prize of 250,000 RMB.

Past winners and runners-up

References

Go competitions in China